Asura pyrostrota is a moth of the family Erebidae. It is found on the Solomon Islands.

References

pyrostrota
Moths described in 1914
Moths of Oceania